The Gymnasium Hummelsbüttel is a German high school. It is located in Hummelsbüttel, Hamburg. Gymnasium Hummelsbüttel includes the grades 5–12. In the same area there are a kindergarten (Christophorus Kindergarten) and an elementary school (Grundschule Grützmühlenweg). Gymnasium Hummelsbüttel was founded in 1972. The current principal is Thorsten Schüler.

Buildings

Gymnasium Hummelsbüttel includes 8 buildings:

The schoolhouse
2 sports halls
A building in which are special rooms for art, science, a theater, the canteen
An administrative building
The schoolhouse of Grundschule Grützmühlenweg
Christophorus Kindergarten

Athletics

Gymnasium Hummelsbüttel has competitive teams in Soccer(w/m), volleyball(w) and table tennis (m), the most successful being the volleyball team with several victories, many of them in the most recent years.

2012

Volleyball: After becoming state champions 3 times in a row, the girls volleyball team has been eliminated in semi finals by champions-to-be Gymnasium Heidberg and finished third.

Table Tennis: The 2011 runner up also finished third in 2012.

Soccer: 2012 has seen the worst results for Hummelsbüttel soccer for years. They finished 4th out of 6 in their group which means being eliminated in preliminary round. Also the U11 and U13 indoor teams have been eliminated in early stages of the tournaments.

Notable alumni

Otto Addo Ghanaian soccer player
Jörg Pilawa German game show host

Gymnasiums in Germany
Schools in Hamburg
Buildings and structures in Wandsbek